Van Auken Creek is a  tributary of the Lackawaxen River in Wayne County, Pennsylvania in the United States.

Van Auken Creek and the West Branch Lackawaxen River join near Prompton to form the main stem of the Lackawaxen River.

See also
List of rivers of Pennsylvania

References

Rivers of Wayne County, Pennsylvania
Rivers of Pennsylvania
Tributaries of the Lackawaxen River